Balch Pond  is a  water body located on the New Hampshire-Maine border, in the towns of Wakefield, New Hampshire, and Acton and Newfield, Maine. A northwest portion of the lake in New Hampshire is known as Stump Pond. Water flows from the eastern end of Balch Pond into the Little Ossipee River, a tributary of the Saco River.

The lake is classified as a warmwater fishery, with observed species including largemouth bass, chain pickerel, brown bullhead, black crappie, yellow perch, and sunfish.

See also

List of lakes in Maine
List of lakes in New Hampshire

References

Lakes of York County, Maine
Lakes of Carroll County, New Hampshire
Lakes of Maine
Lakes of New Hampshire